Club Deportivo Illescas is a Spanish football team based in Illescas, Toledo, in the autonomous community of Castile-La Mancha. Founded in 1962, it  plays in Tercera División, holding home matches at Estadio Municipal de Illescas, with a capacity of 1,000 spectators.

Season to season

13 seasons in Tercera División

References

External links
Futbolme team profile 

Football clubs in Castilla–La Mancha
Association football clubs established in 1962
1962 establishments in Spain
Illescas, Toledo